Kellysville is an unincorporated community in Mercer County, West Virginia, United States. Kellysville has a post office with ZIP code 24732.

References

Unincorporated communities in Mercer County, West Virginia
Unincorporated communities in West Virginia